Valikamam ( valikāmam) is one of the three historic regions of Jaffna peninsula in northern Sri Lanka. The other two regions are Thenmarachchi and Vadamarachchi. Alternative spellings include Valikaamam or Valigamam.

Etymology
Valikamam translates to "the sandy village" in English. It is derived from the Tamil words vali (sand) and kamam (village). It is also an equivalent to the ancient name of Jaffna with the same meaning, Manaltidar or Manarridal.

See also
 Piranpattu
 Thenmarachchi
 Vadamarachchi

References

 
Geography of Jaffna District